Lao Plaza Hotel is a hotel at 63 Samsenthai Road, Vientiane, Laos, located next to the Lao National Museum. It build itself as the first 5-star hotel in Laos. The rooms of the hotel are described by Frommers as "bland" and decorated in beige and blue. The hotel has 142 rooms and there are 3 restaurants.

References

Hotels in Vientiane
Hotels established in 1997
Hotel buildings completed in 1997